Ardabilaq (also Romanized as Ardabīlaq; also known as Ardabilya) is a village in Khvoresh Rostam-e Shomali Rural District, Khvoresh Rostam District, Khalkhal County, Ardabil Province, Iran.

It is located in the Alborz (Elburz) mountain range.

At the 2006 census, its population was 33, in 10 families.

References 

Tageo

Towns and villages in Khalkhal County
Settled areas of Elburz